Atwell may refer to:

People
 Atwell (surname)

Places
In the United States
 Atwell, Missouri, an unincorporated community
 Atwell, West Virginia, an unincorporated community
 Atwell Township, Rowan County, North Carolina, a civil township

Elsewhere
 Atwell, Western Australia, a suburb of Perth
 Atwell Peak, the southern peak of Mount Garibaldi, a stratovolcano in British Columbia, Canada

Other
 Atwell, a house of The Skinners' School in England
 Atwell College, Western Australia

See also
 Attwell (disambiguation)
 Atwill